Randolph is an unincorporated community in Bibb County, Alabama, United States. At the 2010 census, the population was 1,169.

History
The community had a post office, with postmasters appointed from 1839 to 1971.

Geography

Education
Randolph has an elementary school, serving students from Kindergarten to 6th grade.

References

Unincorporated communities in Alabama
Unincorporated communities in Bibb County, Alabama